Within molecular and cell biology, HLA-DQ3 (DQ3) is a broad serotype category with split antigens HLA-DQ7, DQ8, and DQ9. Historically, originally recognized as MB3 a DC4 serotype, DQw3 was one of three early determined antigens recognized as HLA-DQ along with HLA-DQ1 and HLA-DQ2. While the DQ3 molecules are structurally similar in beta chain, the DQ molecules differ markedly in function, even when present with the same DQ alpha subunit. For this reason they are best treated independently.

Serology

The serotyping efficiency of DQ3 recognition relative to DQ2, DQ7, DQ8, and DQ9 is shown to the left. Compared to DQ2 serotyping of DQB1*0201 positive individuals (98%), the efficiency of DQ3 recognition is relatively low and error prone. This compares to genotyping efficiency of 100%. The recognition of DQB1*0303 by DQ9 and or DQ3 is poorest, DQ2 which recognizes a different DBB1*group recognizes DQB1*0303 as efficiently
as DQ3.

For this reason DQ3 serotyping is a poor method of typing for transplantation or disease association prediction or study.
Nonetheless, it is still widely used and association purported in the literature.

Alleles

DQB1*0301
DQB1*0301 the DQ7 gene, is detailed on HLA-DQ7

DQB1*0302
DQB1*0302 the DQ8 gene, is detailed on HLA-DQ8

DQB1*0303
DQB1*0303 the DQ9 gene, is detailed on HLA-DQ9

DQB1*0304
DQB1*0304 is similar in structure and function to DQB1*0301 generally considered to be HLA-DQ7

DQB1*0305
DQB1*0305 is similar in structure and function to DQB1*0302 generally considered to be HLA-DQ8

References

HLA-DQ haplotypes